Campyliadelphus is a genus of mosses belonging to the family Amblystegiaceae.

The genus was first described by Nils Conrad Kindberg.

The genus has cosmopolitan distribution.

Species:
 Campyliadelphus chrysophyllus
 Campyliadelphus elodes

References

Amblystegiaceae
Moss genera